Osokhtokh (Ohoxtoox) is a rural locality (a selo) in Eginsky Rural Okrug of Verkhoyansky District in the Sakha Republic, Russia, located  from Batagay, the administrative center of the district, and  from Saydy, the administrative center of the rural okrug.  Its population as of the 2010 Census was 140, down from 148 recorded during the 2002 Census.

Geography 
The village is located north of the Arctic Circle, by the Baky river.

References

Notes

Sources
Official website of the Sakha Republic. Registry of the Administrative-Territorial Divisions of the Sakha Republic. Verkhoyansky District. 

Rural localities in Verkhoyansky District
Yana basin